Lajos Bíró (born Lajos Blau; 22 August 1880 – 9 September 1948) was a Hungarian novelist, playwright, and screenwriter who wrote many films from the early 1920s through the late 1940s.

Life 
He was born in Nagyvárad, Kingdom of Hungary, Austro-Hungarian Empire (now Oradea, Romania) and eventually moved to the United Kingdom where he worked as a scenario chief for London Film Productions run by Alexander Korda, collaborating on many screenplays with Arthur Wimperis. He died in London on 9 September 1948 of a heart attack.  He is buried in the northern section of Hampstead Cemetery in north London.

In 1929, he was nominated for an Academy Award for Best Original Writing for The Last Command, but lost to Ben Hecht for Underworld, the only other nomination in this category.

Novels
A Serpolette (The Serpolette, 1914)
A bazini zsidók (The Jews of Bazin; 1921).

Plays

 Szinmü négy felvon (Hotel Imperial) (1917)
 Gods and Kings, six one-act plays (English translation 1945)

Partial filmography

The Prince and the Pauper (1920)
A Vanished World (1922)
 The House of Molitor (1922)
Tragedy in the House of Habsburg (1924)
Forbidden Paradise (1924) (play)
Eve's Secret (1925)
 A Modern Dubarry (1927)
 The Heart Thief (1927)
 Hotel Imperial (1927) (play)
The Way of All Flesh (1927)
The Last Command (1928) (story)
Yellow Lily (1928)
Night Watch (1928)
The Haunted House (1928)
Women Everywhere (1930)
Michael and Mary (1931)
Service for Ladies (1932)
The Golden Anchor (1932)
 The Faithful Heart (1932)
Strange Evidence (1933)
The Private Life of Henry VIII (1933)
Catherine the Great (1934) (play)
The Private Life of Don Juan (1934)
The Scarlet Pimpernel (1934)
Sanders of the River (1935)
The Ghost Goes West (1935)
Rembrandt (1936)
The Man Who Could Work Miracles (1936)
Dark Journey (1937)
Knight Without Armour (1937)
The Divorce of Lady X (1938)
The Drum (1938)
The Four Feathers (1939)
The Thief of Bagdad (1940)
Five Graves to Cairo (1943) (play)
A Royal Scandal (1945) (play)
An Ideal Husband (1947)

Notes

References

External links
 
 
 
 

1880 births
1948 deaths
Hungarian male novelists
People from Oradea
Austro-Hungarian writers
20th-century Hungarian novelists
20th-century Hungarian dramatists and playwrights
20th-century Hungarian male writers
Hungarian male dramatists and playwrights
Male screenwriters
20th-century Hungarian screenwriters